Diving competitions at the Beijing 2008 Summer Olympics were held from August 10 to August 23, at the Beijing National Aquatics Centre.

Competition format 

The following events were contested by both men and women in Beijing:
3m Springboard Synchronized
10m Platform Synchronized
3m Springboard
10m Platform

Individual events consisted of preliminaries, semifinals and finals. The order of divers in the preliminary round were determined by computerized random selection, during the Technical Meeting. The 18 divers with the highest scores in the preliminaries proceeded to the semifinals.The semifinal consisted of the top 18 ranked divers from the preliminary competition and the final consisted of the top 12 ranked divers from the semifinal.

Competition schedule 

All times are China Standard Time (UTC+8)

Qualifying criteria 

An NOC could enter up to 2 qualified divers in each individual event and up to 1 team in each synchronized event.

Qualifying places for each event were awarded as follows:

Participating countries

Medal summary

Medal table
Retrieved from Beijing Olympics 2008 Official Website.

Men

Women

See also
 Diving at the 2007 Pan American Games

References

External links 
Beijing 2008 Olympic Games
Federation Internationale de Natation
Diving – Official Results Book

 
2008 Summer Olympics events
2008
2008 in diving
Diving competitions in China